The Portsdown Anticline is a north-facing geological fold of Tertiary age affecting rocks in Hampshire, southern England. This upfold of the local sedimentary rock sequence is paralleled by the Bere Forest/Chichester Syncline (downfold) about 2km to its north and a postulated deep fault to the north again. Further west, this major east-west structure adopts more of a NW - SE alignment. At the surface the Portsdown Anticline is seen to affect the Chalk rocks of Late Cretaceous age at Ports Down though it is known to also affect the underlying Jurassic strata.

References 

Anticlines
Geology of Hampshire